Edwin Rodriguez (born February 4, 1973) is known as Ed Bassmaster, an American YouTuber focused on prank comedy and playing many characters. He stars in the CMT reality-TV prank series, The Ed Bassmaster Show.

Early life
Rodriguez was born in the Northeast Philadelphia neighborhood of Philadelphia, Pennsylvania. He describes his mother as "half Italian, half Russian Jew", and his father is Puerto Rican who left the family when he was a toddler. He left high school in 10th grade.

Career
Bassmaster began posting videos in 2006, and gained wide attention in 2015 with his and fellow YouTuber Jesse Wellens's faux surveillance video purporting to show the destruction of the Canadian hitchhiking robot hitchBOT, whose real-life destruction was not filmed. Some news organizations were fooled by the video.

During the YouTube Comedy Week live event in 2013, Skippy, one of Bassmaster's characters, went on stage unannounced and was kicked out of the event.

In January 2015, CMT's The Ed Bassmaster Show launched as a reality-TV series where his characters prank people as on YouTube. It premiered on April 14, 2016.

Personal life
As of 2014, Rodriguez is a married father of four in Northeast Philadelphia.

Filmography

Television

References

External links
Official channel
Ed Bassmaster biography

 
 
 
 

1973 births
21st-century American male actors
American YouTubers
Living people
American male film actors
American male television actors
Prank YouTubers
Male actors from Philadelphia
YouTube channels launched in 2006